Cocada are a traditional coconut confectionery found in many parts of Latin America. They are particularly popular in Argentina, Bolivia, Brazil, Colombia, Chile, Dominican Republic, Mexico, Panama, Venezuela and Ecuador. They are oven baked but are served at room temperature to provide their chewy and soft texture. Made with eggs and shredded coconut, cocadas come in a variety of colors due to the modern use of food coloring, however the traditional variations are golden brown. They are often garnished with almonds, either whole or chopped. There are hundreds of cocadas recipes, from the typical hard, very sweet balls to cocadas that are almost the creamy texture of flan. Other fruit, often dried, can be added to the cocadas to create variety, which will also lend to a wide spectrum of cocada colors.  Cocadas are mentioned as early as 1878 in Peru.

By country

Mexico, Colombia and Uruguay
In Colombia and Mexico, Conserva de coco are sold not only as artisan candies from shops, but commonly on the streets, out of baskets, and particularly on the beaches, by men or women who carry them on large aluminum trays. In Uruguay, they are commonly sold in bakeries under the name of coquitos, the more delicate versions include a cherry on the top and syrup coating, sometimes they fill the boxes of assorted masas.

Brazil 
In Brazil, cocada are a traditional confectionery originating from the north-east of the country. They are often long and thin rather than round, and are sold in the streets.

One variation of cocada in Brazil is the "black cocada" made with brown sugar and slightly burnt coconut. In Brazil, "rei da cocada preta" (black cocada king) is used to refer to an arrogant person who thinks too highly of himself.

Although similar, cocadas and queijadinhas are not the same thing. The cocada is usually made from coconut and sugar only, rolled together to form an amorphous mass. Queijadinha is made with more ingredients, and gets its shape from the baking tin.

Venezuela
In Venezuela, conserva de coco is a candy and cocada is a drink blended with coconut and the confectionery or candy form is called "conserva de coco".

Gallery

See also
 Queijadinha
 Macaroon
 Sugar cake
 List of Brazilian sweets and desserts

References

External links

 Mexico Cooks!, photograph of cocadas.

Brazilian confectionery
Colombian cuisine
Confectionery
Foods containing coconut
Mexican desserts
Venezuelan cuisine
Dominican Republic cuisine